Antonio Quercia is a Chilean cinematographer. He is best known for his work on The Green Inferno and Knock Knock.

Filmography 
Feature films
 Aftershock (2012)
 The Green Inferno (2013)
 Knock Knock (2015)
 No Filter (2016)

References

External links 
 

Year of birth missing (living people)
Living people
Chilean cinematographers